Joseph Hinman Wieskamp (born August 23, 1999) is an American professional basketball player for the Toronto Raptors of the National Basketball Association (NBA) on assignment with the Raptors 905 of the NBA G League. He played college basketball for the Iowa Hawkeyes before being drafted 41st overall in the 2021 NBA draft by the San Antonio Spurs.

Early life and high school career
In middle school, Wieskamp played football as a quarterback and was a talented baseball player. He quit football after breaking his thumb and eventually decided to focus solely on basketball. Wieskamp played basketball for Muscatine High School in his hometown of Muscatine, Iowa. In his freshman season, he averaged 18.6 points per game, which made him the top scoring freshman in Iowa. Wieskamp became the first freshman in Mississippi Athletic Conference (MAC) history to earn all-conference honors. In his sophomore season, he averaged 21.6 points and 10 rebounds per game and was named first-team all-state. 

As a junior, Wieskamp averaged 30.4 points and 10.2 rebounds per game and was recognized as MAC Player of the Year. He became the first Iowa Class 4A player to average 30 points since Jeff Horner in 2002. Wieskamp scored a school-record 50 points in a win over Burlington High School to become Muscatine's all-time leading scorer. He was voted Iowa Gatorade Player of the Year. As a senior, Wieskamp averaged a state-high 33.5 points and 13.5 rebounds per game, leading his team to its first state tournament in 16 years. He repeated as Iowa Gatorade Player of the Year and was named Iowa Mr. Basketball. Wieskamp left high school as the Iowa Class 4A career scoring leader, with 2,376 points.

Recruiting
Wieskamp committed to play college basketball for Iowa on June 9, 2015, before his sophomore year. At the end of his high school career, he was considered a consensus four-star recruit and the best prospect in Iowa.

College career

On January 20, 2019, Wieskamp went 8-for-8 from the floor and scored a season-high 24 points in a 95–71 win over Illinois. Wieskamp had 19 points and five rebounds against Cincinnati in the NCAA tournament. As a freshman he averaged 11.1 points and 4.9 rebounds per game, shooting 42.4 percent from beyond the arc. He started all 35 games and was named to the Big Ten All-freshman team. After the season he declared for the 2019 NBA draft but did not hire an agent. Wieskamp ultimately decided to withdraw from the draft and return to Iowa. 

Coming into his sophomore season, Wieskamp was named to the preseason All-Big Ten team and the watchlist for the Jerry West Award. In his sophomore season opener, Wieskamp hyperextended his elbow and had a shooting slump to start the season. On December 9, he had 23 points in a 72–52 win over Minnesota. Wieskamp scored a then career-high 26 points on January 10, 2020, in a 67–49 win over Maryland. He set a new career-high with 30 points on February 8, in a 96–72 win over Nebraska. At the close of the regular season, Wieskamp was named to the Third Team All-Big Ten by the coaches and media. He averaged 14.0 points and 6.1 rebounds per game and led the Big Ten in free throw shooting at 85.6 percent. 

On February 10, 2021, Wieskamp recorded a junior season-high 26 points and 10 rebounds in a 79–66 win against Rutgers. As a junior, he averaged 14.8 points and 6.6 rebounds per game, shooting 46 percent from three-point range, and was named to the Second Team All-Big Ten. On April 14, Wieskamp declared for the 2021 NBA draft while maintaining his college eligibility. He later decided to remain in the draft.

Professional career

San Antonio Spurs (2021–2022)
On July 29, 2021, Wieskamp was drafted with the 41st overall pick in the 2021 NBA draft by the San Antonio Spurs. Wieskamp was later included in the 2021 NBA Summer League roster of the Spurs. On September 7, the Spurs announced that they had signed Wieskamp to two-way contract. Under the terms of the deal he split time between the Spurs and their NBA G League affiliate, the Austin Spurs. On November 10, 2021, Wieskamp made his NBA debut, scoring 3 points off the bench in a 136–117 win over the Sacramento Kings. On March 4, 2022, the San Antonio Spurs converted Wieskamp's contract into a standard contract.

On August 24, 2022, Wieskamp re-signed with the Spurs, but was later waived on October 17, 2022.

Wisconsin Herd (2022)
On October 22, 2022, Wieskamp was selected second overall in 2022 NBA G League draft. On November 3, Wieskamp was named to the opening night roster for the Wisconsin Herd.

Toronto Raptors (2023–present)
On January 7, 2023, Wieskamp signed a 10-day contract with the Toronto Raptors. He was signed to a second 10-day contract on January 17. On January 27, Wieskamp was reacquired by the Herd. On February 11, he signed a multi-year contract with the Raptors.

Career statistics

NBA

|-
| style="text-align:left;"| 
| style="text-align:left;"| San Antonio
| 29 || 0 || 7.1 || .357 || .326 || .538 || .5 || .3 || .1 || .1 || 2.1
|-
| style="text-align:left;"| 
| style="text-align:left;"| Toronto
| 2 || 0 || 8.5 || .600 || .750 ||  || .0 || .5 || .0 || .0 || 4.5
|- class="sortbottom"
| style="text-align:center;" colspan="2"| Career
| 31 || 0 || 7.2 || .377 || .362 || .538 || .5 || .3 || .1 || .1 || 2.3

College

|-
| style="text-align:left;"| 2018–19
| style="text-align:left;"| Iowa
| 35 || 35 || 27.7 || .488 || .424 || .767 || 4.9 || 1.1 || .9 || .5 || 11.1
|-
| style="text-align:left;"| 2019–20
| style="text-align:left;"| Iowa
| 31 || 31 || 32.5 || .427 || .347 || .856 || 6.1 || 1.6 || 1.0 || .5 || 14.0
|-
| style="text-align:left;"| 2020–21
| style="text-align:left;"| Iowa
| 31 || 31 || 29.3 || .491 || .462 || .677 || 6.6 || 1.7 || .9 || .3 || 14.8
|- class="sortbottom"
| style="text-align:center;" colspan="2"| Career
| 97 || 97 || 29.7 || .467 || .412 || .771 || 5.8 || 1.5 || .9 || .4 || 13.2

Personal life
Wieskamp's uncle is Jason Lunn.

References

External links
Iowa Hawkeyes bio

1999 births
Living people
American men's basketball players
Austin Spurs players
Basketball players from Iowa
Iowa Hawkeyes men's basketball players
Muscatine High School alumni
People from Muscatine, Iowa
Raptors 905 players
San Antonio Spurs draft picks
San Antonio Spurs players
Shooting guards
Small forwards
Toronto Raptors players
Wisconsin Herd players
American people of Dutch descent